Alfred Runggaldier (born January 3, 1962) is a former Italian cross-country skier who competed from 1984 to 1994. His best finish at the Winter Olympics was seventh in the 4 × 10 km event at Sarajevo in 1984 while his best individual finish was 11th in the 50 km event at Albertville in 1992.

Runggaldier's best World Cup career finish was third in a 50 km event in Norway in 1990.

Cross-country skiing results
All results are sourced from the International Ski Federation (FIS).

Olympic Games

World Championships

World Cup

Season standings

Individual podiums
1 podium

Team podiums
 1 victory 
 1 podium

References

External links

 Runggaldier Alfred 

1962 births
Living people
Cross-country skiers at the 1984 Winter Olympics
Cross-country skiers at the 1992 Winter Olympics
Italian male cross-country skiers
Olympic cross-country skiers of Italy
Cross-country skiers of Centro Sportivo Carabinieri
Sportspeople from Brixen